Broadward is a hamlet in Herefordshire, England.

The town is steadily growing towards Broadward, with Leominster Cemetery and Owen Way just to the north of Broadward.

The River Arrow flows to the south of the hamlet and Broadward Bridge takes the road across it.

References

Hamlets in Herefordshire